Jan Alam Hssani (born 8 August 1956) is an Afghan former volleyball player who was a member of the national team for more than ten years. Currently he is the Secretary General of the Afghanistan National Olympic Committee; and has served as the President of Afghanistan Athletic Federation for more than 25 years. He is a former president of the Afghanistan Sports Federation, serving during the 2007 and 2008 seasons.

Early life
He was born on 8 August 1956 in Nangarhar Province. From his childhood he showed Interest in playing and taking part in Sports activities.

Education
He finished his school in Afghanistan. He received degree in Physical Education from Punjabi University. He have an International Volleyball Coach degree from Germany. He also studied Sports division in Germany.

References

1956 births
Living people
People from Nangarhar Province
Afghan men's volleyball players